Tommy O'Neill (born 24 December 1955 in Bellshill), is a Scottish former football midfielder.

O'Neill began his career with Motherwell, before moving to Clyde in 1977. He is best known for his time at Clyde, spending 7 years at the club, making 216 league appearances, and finding the back of the net on 45 occasions. He had spells with Hamilton Academical and Airdrieonians  before dropping out of the senior game in 1987. He returned in 1991, making a handful of appearances as player-coach of Stirling Albion, before being promoted to assistant manager.

He currently works as a scout for Aberdeen FC after a successful spell with Celtic.

External links

References

Living people
1955 births
Scottish footballers
Scottish Football League players
Motherwell F.C. players
Clyde F.C. players
Airdrieonians F.C. (1878) players
Hamilton Academical F.C. players
Stirling Albion F.C. players
Celtic F.C. non-playing staff
Association football midfielders